HMS Royalist was one of eight  light cruisers built for the Royal Navy in the 1910s. She fought in the First World War, participating in the Battle of Jutland. Following the war, she was scrapped.

Design and description

The Arethusa-class cruisers were intended to lead destroyer flotillas and defend the fleet against attacks by enemy destroyers.

The main armament of the Arethusa-class ships was two BL 6-inch (152 mm) Mk XII guns that were mounted on the centreline fore and aft of the superstructure and six QF 4-inch Mk V guns in waist mountings. They were also fitted with a single QF 3-pounder  anti-aircraft gun and four  torpedo tubes in two twin mounts.

Construction and career
She was launched on 14 January 1915 at William Beardmore and Company's shipyard. On being commissioned, she was assigned to the 4th Light Cruiser Squadron of the Grand Fleet. From 31 May to 1 June 1916 Royalist took part in the Battle of Jutland. She survived the battle and in February 1917 was reassigned to the 1st Light Cruiser Squadron of the Grand Fleet. She survived the First World War, and was sold for scrapping on 24 August 1922 to Cashmore, of Newport.

Notes

Bibliography

External links

Ships of the Arethusa class
Battle of Jutland Crew Lists Project - HMS Royalist Crew List

Arethusa-class cruisers (1913)
1915 ships
World War I cruisers of the United Kingdom